Mikel Iglesias (born 10 July 1996) is a Spanish actor known for his role as Ignasi on the TV3 show Polseres vermelles. Between 2000 and 2006 Iglesias performed as part of a local theater group in Rubí.

He also performs with the group *Arc Iris d'Amor plays in a civic center in Barcelona.

Filmography

Films

Television

References

External links
 

Male television actors from Catalonia
Living people
Male stage actors from Catalonia
1996 births
21st-century Spanish male actors